Everest Cricket Club Ground is a cricket ground in Georgetown, Guyana.

History
The ground was established in 1928, when the Everest Cricket Club relocated from their original Queenstown ground and acquired a lease on what was swampy land located a short distance from the ocean. The swampy land was quickly transformed into a cricket ground with a sizeable pavilion, with the ground being formally opened on 30 April 1928 by the Governor of British Guiana Cecil Hunter-Rodwell The ground was due to host its inaugural first-class match in the 1996–97 Red Stripe Cup between Guyana and Jamaica, but the match was abandoned. Therefore, the inaugural first-class match played there was between Guyana and a touring England XI in February 1998; since that match, a further four first-class matches were played at the ground, three of which hosted the touring South Africans, Indians and Australians. In addition to hosting first-class matches, the ground also hosted nine List A one-day matches between 1998 and 2011, mostly in the capacity of a neutral venue in the West Indian domestic one-day tournament. During the 2007 Cricket World Cup, the ground was one of two practice venues in Guyana. The ground was one of the venues for the 2022 ICC Under-19 Cricket World Cup, hosting two matches.

Records

First-class
Highest team total: 402 for 6 by Carib Beer XI v Australians, 2002–03
Lowest team total: 118 all out by Guyana Board President's XI v Indians, 2001–02
Highest individual innings: 141 not out by Narsingh Deonarine for Carib Beer XI v Australians, 2002–03
Best bowling in an innings: 7-71 by Neil McGarrell for Guyana v England XI, 1997–98
Best bowling in a match: 11-101 by Robert Croft for England XI v Guyana, as above

List A
Highest team total: 367 for 4 by Leeward Islands v Canada, 2008–09
Lowest team total: 127 all out by United States v Combined Campuses and Colleges, 2008–09
Highest individual innings: 147 by Chris Gayle for Jamaica v Combined Campuses and Colleges, 2011–12
Best bowling in an innings: 6-26 by Kavesh Kantasingh for Combined Campuses and Colleges v Leeward Islands, 2011–12

See also
List of cricket grounds in the West Indies

References

External links
Everest Cricket Club Ground at ESPNcricinfo

Cricket grounds in Guyana
1928 establishments in British Guiana
Georgetown, Guyana